Hawker Island is an irregularly shaped island about  long, lying some 7 km south-west of Davis Station between Mule Island and Mule Peninsula, Vestfold Hills, in the eastern part of Prydz Bay, Antarctica. It was mapped by Norwegian cartographers from aerial photographs taken by the Lars Christensen Expedition, 1936–37. It was remapped by the Australian National Antarctic Research Expeditions (1957–58) and named after Alan Charles Hawker, a radio supervisor at Davis Station in 1957.

Birds
The island supports a breeding colony of southern giant petrels –  the southernmost such colony on continental Antarctica – as well as Adélie penguins and Cape petrels.  The site is protected under the Antarctic Treaty System as Antarctic Specially Protected Area (ASPA) No.167.

See also 
 List of Antarctic and subantarctic islands

References

Islands of Princess Elizabeth Land
Antarctic Specially Protected Areas
Seabird colonies
Penguin colonies